Amblypomacentrus is a small genus of fish in the family Pomacentridae. As of the year 2000, there are 3 species.

Species
Amblypomacentrus breviceps (Schlegel & Müller, 1839) - black-banded demoiselle 
Amblypomacentrus clarus (Allen and Adrim, 2000)
Amblypomacentrus vietnamicus Prokofiev, 2004

References

External links
Froese, R. and D. Pauly, Eds. Amblypomacentrus. FishBase. 2011.

 
Pomacentrinae
Marine fish genera
Taxa named by Pieter Bleeker